"Love Me Again" is a hit song by English singer John Newman. The song was released as a digital download in Europe on 17 May 2013, except for the United Kingdom where it was released on 30 June 2013 as the lead single from his debut studio album, Tribute (2013). The song was written by Newman and Steve Booker and produced by Booker and Mike Spencer. The song was later featured on the soundtrack for video game FIFA 14 and the FIFA 23 Extension for the 2022 FIFA World Cup.

It was nominated for the Brit Award for British Single of the Year at the 2014 BRIT Awards and nominated for the 2014 Ivor Novello Award for Best Song Musically and Lyrically.

Background
In an interview with Digital Spy, Newman was asked if he sensed that the song had something special about it in the studio. He said, "Yeah. The guy I wrote it with (Steve Booker), we turned around and had massive grins on our faces thinking, 'There's something good here'. But you just never know how good it is, you know?".

Newman was also asked if it was hard to write the lyrics about love and break-up, he said, "No, it's the only place where I really open up to somebody, through my music. I'm producing [the album] and writing it, it's good. I like to keep a hold of everything".

With the chord progression of Gm—Bb—Dm—C, the song is written in the key of G Dorian. The key signature is in D minor. Both are modes of F major, of which either one can be used as the tonic note/chord, because, however, the F major chord is not present in the song.

Music video
Two music videos, both with elements of Northern soul dancing, have been released for "Love Me Again". One version directed by Vaughan Arnell is based on the classic love story of Romeo and Juliet. The woman in the video, Juliet, is French actress Margaux Billard, carefully watched over by her brother, Tybalt, played by Joseph Steyne. The Romeo, is British model, Tommy-Lee Winkworth. This video ends in a cliffhanger as they get run over by a truck and their fate remains unknown till Newman's follow-up single "Cheating", which starts with a newspaper article indicating that they had indeed survived the crash, which was a hit-and-run accident.

Another version features Newman, backed by musicians, singing in a dimly lit room.

Accolades

In popular culture
"Love Me Again" was featured on the soundtrack of the video game FIFA 14, giving it cult status among FIFA fans, as well as the Federation's #WorldCupAtHome series, which opened FIFA's archive during the COVID-19 pandemic. It also appeared in the closing credits of the 2014 science fiction film, Edge of Tomorrow, starring Tom Cruise and Emily Blunt. The song was also featured on the American TV series, Suits in the episode, "Buried Secrets", which aired on 6 March 2014, and in the opening scenes of the first episode of season 4, "One-Two-Three Go", which aired 11 June 2014. "Love Me Again" is also a playable song in Just Dance 2015 and is set to be added to the franchise's streaming service. The song was also used as the theme to the television show Whiskey Cavalier which debuted in February 2019 and ended in May after one season. In August 2020 and May 2021 it was used in TV and radio adverts for National Rail.

The French channel TF6 also used this song to shut down its channel.

Remixes and cover versions
The song was remixed by the electronic DJ Kove.

Track listing

Personnel
 Lead vocals – John Newman
 Producers – Steve Booker and Mike Spencer
 Lyrics – John Newman and Steve Booker
 Label: Universal, Island
 Recording software – Apple Logic Pro

Charts

Weekly charts

Year-end charts

Certifications

Release history

References

John Newman (singer) songs
Songs written by Steve Booker (producer)
2013 songs
2013 debut singles
Number-one singles in Greece
Number-one singles in Scotland
UK Singles Chart number-one singles
Island Records singles
Music videos directed by Vaughan Arnell
Songs written by John Newman (singer)
Torch songs
Dance-pop songs